Ádám Lang (born 17 January 1993) is a Hungarian professional footballer who plays as a central defender for Omonia and the Hungary national team.

Club career

Győr
Born in Veszprém, Lang was signed in 2012 by Hungarian League club Győri ETO FC.

He scored his first Hungarian League goal in the 2013–14 Nemzeti Bajnokság I season against Mezőkövesd-Zsóry SE in the 28th minute at ETO Park.

Videoton
On 24 June 2015, Lang was signed by Hungarian League club Videoton FC.

On 21 August 2016, he scored his first goal in the 2016–17 Nemzeti Bajnokság I in a 5–1 victory for Videoton over Debreceni VSC. Lang scored in the 23rd minute and he was able to repeat his feat with another goal in the same match in the 56th minute.

Dijon
Lang signed to Dijon FCO in September 2016; his signing was registered minutes before the transfer window deadline.

On 20 September 2016, he played his first match in the Ligue 1 at the Parc des Princes, Paris, France against Paris Saint-Germain F.C. in the 2016–17 Ligue 1 season. In the 15th minute he scored an own goal and the match ended with a 3–0 defeat for Dijon.

CFR Cluj
Lang penned a deal with Romanian club CFR Cluj on 4 July 2018.

Omonia 
On 27 June 2019, Lang joined Cypriot club Omonia on a three-year deal. In these three years, he won the Cypriot League, the Cup and the Super Cup. He also helped Omonia qualify to, and played in the group stages of the 2020-21 Europa League and the 2021–22 Europa Conference League, the first two times the club had made it to the group stage of a European competition.

In January 2022, he extended his contract until Summer 2025, and expressed his happiness at Omonia. On 17 April 2022, he made his 100th appearance for the club, in a 1–0 home win against Ethnikos Achna in the Cypriot First Division.

International career
On 22 May 2014, Lang played his first match for the Hungary national team against Denmark in a 2–2 draw friendly match at the Nagyerdei Stadion, Debrecen.

Lang was selected for Hungary's Euro 2016 squad.

On 14 June 2016, Lang played in the first group match in a 2–0 victory over Austria at the UEFA Euro 2016 Group F match at Nouveau Stade de Bordeaux, Bordeaux, France. Three days later on 18 June 2016 he played in a 1–1 draw against Iceland at the Stade Vélodrome, Marseille. He also played in the last group match in a 3–3 draw against Portugal at the Parc Olympique Lyonnais, Lyon on 22 June 2016.

On 1 June 2021, Lang was included in the final 26-man squad to represent Hungary at the rescheduled UEFA Euro 2020 tournament.

Career statistics

Club

International

 
Scores and results list Hungary's goal tally first, score column indicates score after each Lang goal.

Honours
Győr
 Nemzeti Bajnokság I: 2012–13
 Szuperkupa: 2013
 Hungarian Cup runner-up: 2012–13

Videoton
 Szuperkupa runner-up: 2015

CFR Cluj
 Liga I: 2018–19
 Supercupa României: 2018

Omonia
 Cypriot First Division: 2020–21
 Cypriot Cup: 2021–22
 Cypriot Super Cup: 2021

References

External links
Ádám Lang at MLSZ.hu 
Ádám Lang at HLSZ.hu 

1993 births
Living people
People from Veszprém
Hungarian footballers
Association football defenders
Nemzeti Bajnokság I players
Veszprém LC footballers
Győri ETO FC players
Fehérvár FC players
Ligue 1 players
Dijon FCO players
Ligue 2 players
AS Nancy Lorraine players
Liga I players
CFR Cluj players
Hungary youth international footballers
Hungary under-21 international footballers
Hungary international footballers
UEFA Euro 2016 players
UEFA Euro 2020 players
Hungarian expatriate footballers
Expatriate footballers in France
Hungarian expatriate sportspeople in France
Expatriate footballers in Romania
Hungarian expatriate sportspeople in Romania
Sportspeople from Veszprém County